Ariadna Edo Beltrán (born 1 July 1998) is a partially sighted Spanish Paralympic swimmer who competes in international level events. She was a bronze medalist at the 2016 Summer Paralympics in the women's 400m freestyle S13, a five-time World bronze medalist and a three-time European bronze medalist.

References

1998 births
Living people
Sportspeople from Castellón de la Plana
Swimmers from Madrid
Paralympic swimmers of Spain
Swimmers at the 2016 Summer Paralympics
Medalists at the 2016 Summer Paralympics
Medalists at the World Para Swimming Championships
Medalists at the World Para Swimming European Championships
Spanish female freestyle swimmers
Spanish female butterfly swimmers
Spanish female medley swimmers
S13-classified Paralympic swimmers
21st-century Spanish women